The 1994 Nevada gubernatorial election took place on November 8, 1994. Incumbent Democrat Bob Miller won re-election to a second term as Governor of Nevada, defeating Republican nominee Jim Gibbons (who would later go on to narrowly win the governorship in 2006, twelve years later). This would be the last victory by a Democrat in a governors race in Nevada until Steve Sisolak's victory in the 2018 election twenty-four years later, and remains the last time that a Democratic governor has won re-election.

Democratic primary

Candidate 
Bob Miller, incumbent Governor of Nevada
Janis Lyle Laverty, incumbent Mayor of Las Vegas
Rhinestone Cowboy
Samuel F. Bull, perennial candidate
Thomas Gaule
Carlo Poliak, sanitation worker and frequent candidate

Results

Republican primary

Candidate 
Jim Gibbons, state assemblyman
Cheryl Lau, current secretary of state
Edward E. "Ned" Eyre Jr., perennial candidate
Ken Santor, state treasurer
Hilary "Sir" Michael Milko
Suzanne Nounna

Results

General elections

Candidates 
 Bob Miller (D), incumbent Governor of Nevada
 Jim Gibbons (R), state assemblyman

Results

References

1994
Nevada
Gubernatorial